Keith Hunt may refer to:

Keith Hunt, character on Knowing Me Knowing You with Alan Partridge (TV series)
Keith Hunt (politician) on List of Mayors of Gold Coast, Australia